Barrosasaurus is a genus of titanosaurian sauropod dinosaur, first described by paleontologists Leonardo Salgado and Rodolfo Coria in 2009. The fossils, consisting of three fossil dorsal (back) vertebrae, are well-preserved but incomplete. They were discovered in the Anacleto Formation of the Neuquén province of western Argentina. The type species is Barrosasaurus casamiquelai. The genus name is named after the Sierra Barrosa in Neuquén. The specific epithet honours the Argentinian paleontologist Rodolfo Magín Casamiquela. It's been estimated to be 18 meters (60 ft) in length and 13.5 tonnes (14.9 short tons) in weight.

References

Late Cretaceous dinosaurs of South America
Titanosaurs
Fossil taxa described in 2009
Taxa named by Rodolfo Coria
Anacleto Formation
Cretaceous Argentina